The 1895 Chicago Colts season was the 24th season of the Chicago Colts franchise, the 20th in the National League and the 3rd at West Side Park. The Colts finished fourth in the National League with a record of 72–58.

Regular season

Season standings

Record vs. opponents

Roster

Player stats

Batting

Starters by position 
Note: Pos = Position; G = Games played; AB = At bats; H = Hits; Avg. = Batting average; HR = Home runs; RBI = Runs batted in

Other batters 
Note: G = Games played; AB = At bats; H = Hits; Avg. = Batting average; HR = Home runs; RBI = Runs batted in

Pitching

Starting pitchers 
Note: G = Games pitched; IP = Innings pitched; W = Wins; L = Losses; ERA = Earned run average; SO = Strikeouts

Other pitchers 
Note: G = Games pitched; IP = Innings pitched; W = Wins; L = Losses; ERA = Earned run average; SO = Strikeouts

References 
1895 Chicago Colts season at Baseball Reference

Chicago Cubs seasons
Chicago Cubs season
Chicago Cubs